Chojnice (or Chòjnice; formerly  or Conitz) is a town in northern Poland with 39,423 inhabitants as of December 2021, near the Tuchola Forest. It is the capital of the Chojnice County in the Pomeranian Voivodeship.

History

Piast Poland

Chojnice was founded  around 1205 (although the date is considered to be estimate) in Gdańsk Pomerania (Pomeralia), a duchy ruled at the time by the Samborides, who had originally been appointed governors of the province by Bolesław III Wrymouth of Poland. Gdańsk Pomerania had been part of Poland since the 10th century, with few episodes of autonomy, yet under Swietopelk II, who came into power in 1217, it gained independence in 1227.  The duchy extended roughly from the river Vistula in the east, to the rivers Łeba or Grabowa in the west, and from the  rivers Noteć and Brda in the south-west and south, to the Baltic Sea in the north. By 1282 the duchy had returned to Poland.

The town's name is Polish in origin and comes from the name of the river Chojnica (today named Jarcewska Struga) that was located near the town. The name first appears in written documents in 1275.

State of the Teutonic Order (1309–1466)
In 1309 the Teutonic Knights took over the town, and Chojnice became part of the State of the Teutonic Order. Under Winrich von Kniprode the defensive capabilities and inner structures of the town were improved considerably. Around the middle of the 14th century the stone church of St. John was built. At the same time the Augustinians from the town of Stargard in Pomerania settled in the town; they opened their monastery in 1365. Textile production flourished, and between 1417-1436 Konitz became an important centre for textile production.

During the Polish–Lithuanian–Teutonic War, in 1410, the town was briefly occupied by Polish troops. In 1440 the town joined the Prussian Confederation, which opposed Teutonic rule, however, it later left the organisation. In 1454 King Casimir IV Jagiellon re-incorporated the territory to the Kingdom of Poland, and the townspeople overthrew the pro-Teutonic town council in attempt to join Poland, however the council with the Teutonic Knights recaptured the town shortly after. On 18 September 1454 the Polish army led by King Casimir IV Jagiellon lost the Battle of Chojnice. During the subsequent Thirteen Years' War there were attempts of the townspeople to resist the Teutonic Knights. Shortly before the end of the war the troops of the Teutonic Order, led by Captain Kaspar Nostiz von Bethes, surrendered the town in 1466 to the Polish army led by Piotr Dunin, after a three-month siege, as the last Teutonic-held town in Gdańsk Pomerania.

Kingdom of Poland (1466–1772)

After the Second Peace of Thorn of 1466 the Teutonic Knights renounced any claims to Chojnice, and the town became again part of Poland. It was located in the Człuchów County in the Pomeranian Voivodeship. Chojnice was an important center of cloth production in Poland. Cloth production was the main branch of the local economy, and in 1570, clothiers constituted 36% of all craftsmen in the town. To this day, one of the main streets in the town center is called Ulica Sukienników ("Clothiers' Street").

In the 16th century the city council accepted the Protestant Reformation officially, and Protestants took over the parish church. The Roman Catholic priest Jan Siński died in the following turmoil. In 1555 King Sigismund II Augustus confirmed religious freedom for the city. In 1616 the St. John's church was restored to the Catholics thanks to local parish priest Jan Doręgowski. In 1620 the first Jesuits came into the town and began the Counter Reformation. In 1622 the Jesuits founded a school, which under the name Liceum Ogólnokształcące im. Filomatów Chojnickich w Chojnicach is today one of the oldest high schools in Poland.

In the year 1627 a fire destroyed parts of the town. During the Second Northern War (against Sweden, 1655–1660) the Battle of Chojnice (1656) was fought. The town suffered heavily from the siege, plundering and fire, especially in 1657. Cloth production declined as a result of the Swedish invasion, however, it soon revived. In 1733–1744 the Baroque Jesuit Church of the Annunciation of the Blessed Virgin Mary was built. A large fire destroyed the town again in 1742.

Prussia (1772–1871) and German Empire (1871–1920)
After the first partition of Poland the town became part of the Kingdom of Prussia in 1772. The Prussians abolished the local government, which was restored in 1809. The cloth industry collapsed. The town was subject to anti-Polish policies, including Germanisation. At the local gymnasium, Polish was taught only two hours a week, in 1815-1820 and 1846-1912, and in 1889 the history of Polish literature was removed from the curriculum, while Polish history was not taught at all. Probably in 1830 a secret organization of Polish students was established in the local school. Some Polish students joined the Polish uprisings of 1830 and 1863 in the Russian Partition of Poland. The organisation probably ceased to exist in the 1860s, because in 1870, a new youth philomath organization Mickiewicz was founded, named after the Polish national poet Adam Mickiewicz. In 1901, due to the threat of repressions by the German authorities, the organization was dissolved to be reactivated after a few months. One of the main escape routes for insurgents of the unsuccessful Polish November Uprising from partitioned Poland to the Great Emigration led through the town.

In 1864 a telegraph connection to Szczecin (then Stettin) began operation. In 1868 the town was connected to the railway network. This improved industrial development quite considerably. In 1870 a gas power plant was installed. The town was connected in 1873 by the railway to Dirschau (Tczew) and in 1877 by railway to Stettin. In 1886 a new  hospital was built in the town. A new railway line to Nakel (Nakło)  was opened in 1894. In the year of 1900 the town obtained both a water supply system and an electricity power plant. In 1902 a railway line to Berent (Kościerzyna) was opened. During the time span 1900–1902 the Konitz ritual murder case & antisemitic pogrom was committed by the Germans. In 1909 a sewage system was installed in the town. In 1912 the Gazeta Chojnicka, the first Polish language newspaper, appeared  in the town. Chojnice experienced the heaviest Germanisation in Gdańsk Pomerania.

Poland (1920–1939)

After the regulations of the Treaty of Versailles had become effective in 1920, Chojnice together with 62% of the former province of West Prussia was re-integrated into the Second Polish Republic, which regained independence in 1918, and Polish troops entered the town. A local citizen, Barbara Stammowa, symbolically broke shackles on the balcony of the town hall - in revenge Nazis murdered her in 1939 when the town was re-occupied by Germany. In the interwar period two official visits of Presidents of Poland to Chojnice took place, as Stanisław Wojciechowski visited the town in 1924 and Ignacy Mościcki in 1927. In 1932 a regional museum was opened in Chojnice.

World War II and Nazi German occupation (1939–1945)

During the Nazi German invasion of Poland Wehrmacht troops occupied Chojnice on September 1, 1939, in the morning  at 4:45 o'clock. This invasion gave rise to the Battle of Chojnice.

From the beginning of the German occupation, German militiamen attacked their Jewish and Polish neighbors. On 26 September 1939 forty people were shot, followed by a priest and 208 psychiatric patients. From late October 1939 through early 1940, mass executions were conducted by SS and the German police as part of the Intelligenzaktion, an action against the Polish intelligentsia.  In total, by January 1940 900 Poles and Jews from Chojnice and its surrounding villages were killed, including parliamentarians, teachers, merchants, postal workers, border guards, priests, farmers. The site of the massacres was the Igły Valley near Chojnice, later also known as the Valley of Death.

Hans Kruger - a Nazi activist - became a judge in Chojnice, and during his rule executions of the local population followed. On January 18, 1945, the Germans carried out a single large massacre in the Igły Valley, in which they murdered some 800 Poles.

During the occupation, the Annunciation of Mary church was taken over by Protestants and its interior was devastated.

The Pomeranian Griffin, Kashubian Griffin and Home Army Polish underground resistance organisations were active in the area. In 1943, local Poles managed to save some kidnapped Polish children from the Zamość region, by buying them from the Germans at the local train station.

Chojnice since 1945
In February 1945 the Red Army captured the town. During the fighting about 800 soldiers died, and the town centre was heavily damaged. After the end of World War II Polish authorities began the reconstruction of the city. In 1945–1975, it was part of the Pomeranian Voivodeship, and during the time span 1975–1998 the town belonged to the Bydgoszcz Voivodeship.

In 2002 a new, modern hospital was opened on the north-west outskirts of the town.

Demographics
The population of Chojnice has increased generally since the 18th century. However World War I and World War II, reduced the town's population.  When the regulations of the Treaty of Versailles became effective in 1920, many   Germans left the town. The influence of World War II  is evident in the 1948 census showing that the population was reduced by 1,900 people compared to 1933. After World War II Germans inhabitants either fled or were expelled from the city in accordance with the Potsdam Agreement.

Detailed data as of 31 December 2021:

Number of inhabitants by year

Attractions

The Museum of History and Ethnography in Chojnice opened in 1932. It was damaged during World War II and reopened in 1960. It is located in the medieval town walls and Człuchów Gate.

The town also has a number of medieval and early modern buildings, including several churches. The most prominent churches are the Gothic  and the Baroque .

Geography

Climate 
Climate in this area has mild differences between highs and lows, and there is adequate rainfall year-round.  The Köppen Climate Classification subtype for this climate is "Cfb". (Marine West Coast Climate/Oceanic climate).

Sport
Chojniczanka Chojnice football club is based in the town.

Notable people 

 Michał Kazimierz Radziwiłł (1625–1680), Polish-Lithuanian magnate, starost of Chojnice
 Johann Ernst Gotzkowsky (1710–1775) a Prussian diplomat and merchant of trinkets, silk, taft, porcelain, grain and bills of exchange
 Nathanael Matthaeus von Wolf (1724-1784) was a German botanist, physician, and astronomer 
 Johann Daniel Titius (1729–1796), astronomer, physicist, biologist
 Antoni Klawiter (1836-1913) a Roman Catholic and later an independent Polish Catholic priest
 Emil Albert Friedberg (1837–1910) a German jurist and canonist. 
 Rudolf Arnold Nieberding (1838–1912), jurist and politician
 Hartwig Cassel (1850–1929) a chess journalist, editor and promoter
 Hugo Heimann (1859–1951), German publisher and politician
Leopold Prince (1880–1951), Jewish-American lawyer, politician, judge, and conductor; born here
 Heinrich Recke (1890–1943), Wehrmacht general
 Willi Apel (1893–1988), German-US musicologist; born here
 Eugeniusz Kłopotek (born 1953) a Polish politician and MEP 
 Dariusz Pasieka (born 1965), Polish former professional footballer, over 360 pro games
 Misheel Jargalsaikhan (born 1988) a Polish child actress of Mongolian heritage
 Irmina Gliszczyńska (born 1992) a Polish competitive sailor, competed at the 2016 Summer Olympics
 Arkadiusz Reca (born 1995) a Polish professional football player

International relations

Chojnice is twinned with:

See also
 Chojnice (PKP station)
 Battle of Chojnice
 Konitz affair, an anti-Semitic riot in 1900

References

External links

 Chojnice city portal website
 www.miastochojnice.pl
 Officers, addresses, phone numbers
 Chamber of Commerce/Tourism
 A site devoted to providing information about city history (Polish language)

Cities and towns in Pomeranian Voivodeship
Chojnice County
Pomeranian Voivodeship (1919–1939)
Holocaust locations in Poland
Nazi war crimes in Poland